Samuell may refer to:

W. W. Samuell High School, public secondary school located in the Pleasant Grove area of Dallas, Texas (USA)
Paul Samuell (1886–1938), American jurist
Yann Samuell (born 1965), French film director, and screenwriter
Samuell Jude House (born 2021)

See also
Samuel